Prince David may refer to:

 HMCS Prince David (F89), a ship of the Royal Canadian Navy
 Prince David Bagration of Mukhrani (born 1976), claimed head of the Georgian (Bagrationi) royal dynasty
 Prince David Chavchavadze (born 1924), American author, born a Georgian nobleman
 Prince David Kawānanakoa (1868–1908), Prince of Hawaiʻi, patriarch of the House of Kawānanakoa, father of the below
 Prince David Kalākaua Kawānanakoa (1904–1953), Prince of Hawaiʻi, patriarch of the House of Kawānanakoa, son of the above
 Prince David of Georgia (1767–1819), head of the Georgian (Bagrationi) royal dynasty, regent of Georgia (Kartli-Kakheti)
 Prince David, also known as Prince Charming and David Nolan, a character from the ABC television series Once Upon a Time

See also
 King David I of Scotland (1084–1153), known as David, Prince of the Cumbrians, prior to ascending the throne
 King David (disambiguation)

A KING.